The Roosevelt Island Tramway is an aerial tramway in New York City that spans the East River and connects Roosevelt Island to the Upper East Side of Manhattan. The tramway is the first commuter aerial tramway in North America, having opened in 1976. Since then, over 26 million passengers have ridden the tram.

The tram consists of two cars that run back and forth on two parallel tracks. It is one of the few forms of mass transit in New York City not run by the Metropolitan Transportation Authority, although it uses the MTA's MetroCard and has free transfers to the subway system.

The tram is operated by Leitner-Poma on behalf of the Roosevelt Island Operating Corporation of the State of New York, a state public benefit corporation created in 1984 to run services on the island.

History

Roosevelt Island had been connected to Manhattan by a trolley (streetcar) line that crossed over the Queensboro Bridge from its opening in 1909. Trolleys to and from Queens stopped in the middle of the bridge to meet an elevator, which then took passengers down to the island. As the only connection to the rest of the city from the island, the trolley remained in service until April 7, 1957, long after most other trolley service had been dismantled in the city, and was the last trolley line in New York State; it was replaced by buses. At that time, a bridge to Queens was completed, requiring a roundabout trip to reach Manhattan.

Early history
Beginning in the mid-1970s, Roosevelt Island was redeveloped to accommodate low- to mid-income housing projects, necessitating the construction of a new public transit connection to the city.  The trolley tracks had deteriorated beyond repair and the Roosevelt Island subway station serving the island via the 63rd Street subway connection had not yet been completed. In 1971, the Urban Development Corporation retained Lev Zetlin Associates to select and design a transit connection to Roosevelt Island. James A O'Kon PE led the LZA team in carrying out a feasibility study and design. Three alternate modes were studied: a ferry, an elevator from the bridge, and the aerial tramway. The tramway was selected and the system was designed for bidding. Von Roll was selected to supply and erect the tram and its equipment. With the elevator to Roosevelt Island closed, the footpath on the bridge was shuttered in 1974, with the expectation that the tramway would open soon. The towers for the tram system were erected by July 1975, with completion projected for December of that year.

The tram system was opened in July 1976 as a temporary solution for the island's commuting needs. As the subway project fell further behind schedule, the "tram" became more popular and was converted into a permanent facility, and the tram held a monopoly for service between Roosevelt Island and the rest of Manhattan until the subway connection to the island was finally completed in October 1989. Before the subway opened, though, there were two major disruptions in service: in 1978, for replacement of deteriorated cables, and in 1986, after the liability insurance policy for the tramway expired.

After the 63rd Street Subway was completed, daily ridership declined sharply, from 5,500 daily riders in 1989 to 3,000 by 1993. The tram was closed from October 1993 to January 1994 for repairs.

The tram was the last holdout for the use of tokens in the New York City transit system. Initially, it used a special token, which was later replaced by the standard variety for subways and buses. Although tokens were phased out in favor of the MetroCard by 2003, the tram did not start to accept MetroCards until March 1, 2004. The fare is the same as that on the buses and subways: U.S. $2.75 for a one-way trip, with free transfers to the subway and buses. During the 2005 New York City transit strike, the tramway was one of the few intra-city public transportation systems still in operation, since it was privately operated.

Breakdowns

On April 18, 2006, at about 5:22 p.m. EDT, the two trams were stuck over the East River for over eleven hours because of mechanical problems, trapping 69 people. Rescue baskets capable of holding up to 15 people were sent up to the stranded cable cars at 10:55 p.m., with children and elderly going first, and each rescue taking about 20 minutes. These baskets also carried supplies to the trams, such as blankets, baby formula, and food, for the remaining passengers. Passengers on the Roosevelt Island–bound tram were rescued by about 2:55 a.m. on April 19, while those on the Manhattan-bound tram were not rescued until 4:07 a.m.

The April 2006 incident had been the second time in eight months that the tram system lost power. On September 2, 2005, more than 80 people were trapped on the tram for over 90 minutes. After that incident, state inspectors cited the Roosevelt Island Tramway for not having an operational diesel backup, or motor-generator system. The State Department of Labor said the system did not pass electrical inspection and could not run when the April 18 power outage took place.

The tramway suspended operations after the April 2006 incident, reopening on September 1, 2006. The tram's backup electrical systems were refurbished, and "in case of an emergency, each car now is equipped with blankets, water, food, and a toilet with a privacy curtain. Car attendants will carry cell phones with their radios."

Renovation

On March 1, 2010, the tramway was closed as part of a $25 million project to upgrade and modernize the system. With the help of the French company Poma, all components were replaced except for the three tower bases. Among the improvements, the new tram cables and cars are now allowed to operate independently of each other in a "dual-haul" system. Prior to this, the cars had to travel at the same time, which presented maintenance and emergency response issues. The old cabins may be preserved on Roosevelt Island and/or in a museum.

The tramway reopened November 30, 2010. The project was completed in nine months, two months longer than originally planned.

Characteristics
The Roosevelt Island Tramway contains two cabins that each run back and forth, suspended from their own pair of cables. Each cabin has a capacity of up to 110 people and makes approximately 115 trips per day. The tram runs every seven and half minutes from 6:00 a.m. to 2:00 a.m. (3:30 a.m. on weekends) and runs continuously during rush hours.

The tramway's original operating components and cabins (prior to the 2010 renovation) are identical to the "Skyride" to access Grouse Mountain in Vancouver, Canada.

The Roosevelt Island Tramway was the only aerial commuter tram in the US from 1976 until 2006, when the Portland Aerial Tram opened.

Accessibility and transfers

The tram is wheelchair accessible. Bicycles are permitted on the tram. MetroCard is accepted on the Roosevelt Island Tramway, and riders can transfer to or from buses and subway stations on either end for free. , the OMNY fare-payment system is not accepted on the Roosevelt Island Tramway.

On Roosevelt Island, the "Red Bus" route meets the tram and offers transportation around the island for free. During the tramway reconstruction, the Red Bus was extended to Queens Plaza and the Manhattan side of the Queensboro Bridge. The publicly operated Q102 bus also provides transportation on the island.

See also
Lists of crossings of the East River
Transportation in New York City

References

External links

Pictorials

Public transportation in New York City
East River
Aerial tramways in the United States
Roosevelt Island
1976 establishments in New York City